Collis may refer to:

 Collis (surname)
 Collis (planetary geology), a term used in planetary geology for a small hill or knob
 Collis, Minnesota, an unincorporated community, United States
 Collis, former name of Kerman, California, United States
 Collis Potter Huntington (1821-1900), American railway executive
Collis, a genus of Asian funnel weavers
Collis, a genus of trilobites